Club Daze Volume II: Live in the Bars is a live album by the American heavy metal band Twisted Sister, released in 2002. The album contains live performances recorded for radio shows in 1979–1980 and two previously unreleased studio tracks. The studio tracks were written and demoed during the recording sessions for Stay Hungry (1984) and completed by the classic line-up in 2001.

Track listing

Tracks 10-13: From off the air, first generation cassette copies.

Personnel

Twisted Sister
Dee Snider - lead vocals
Jay Jay French - guitars, backing vocals, lead vocals on "Can't Stand Still", producer
Eddie Ojeda - guitars, backing vocals
Mark Mendoza - bass, backing vocals, producer, engineer, mixing
Tony Petri - drums, percussion
A. J. Pero - drums on tracks 1 and 2

Production
Denny McNearney - studio tracks engineer, mixing, digital mastering

References

Twisted Sister albums
2002 live albums
Spitfire Records live albums